Batovo may refer to:

Batovo, Bulgaria, a village in the municipality of Dobrichka in Dobrich Province, Bulgaria
Batiovo, an urban-type settlement in the Berehove District, Zakarpattia Oblast, Ukraine